Viviennea salma is a moth in the family Erebidae first described by Herbert Druce in 1896. It is found in Venezuela and Honduras.

References

Phaegopterina
Arctiinae of South America
Moths described in 1896